The Statute Law Revision (Scotland) Act 1906 (6 Edw 7 c 38) is an Act of the Parliament of the United Kingdom.

It revised the Pre-Union Acts of the Parliament of Scotland.

This Act was partly in force in Great Britain at the end of 2010.

The Schedule to this Act was repealed by section 1 of, and Part I of the Schedule to, the Statute Law Revision Act 1927.

See also
Statute Law Revision Act

References
Council of Law Reporting. The Law Reports. The Public General Statutes, passed in the Sixth Year of the Reign of His Majesty King Edward the Seventh, 1906. London. 1906. Pages 113 to 210.

United Kingdom Acts of Parliament 1906
Acts of the Parliament of the United Kingdom concerning Scotland
1906 in Scotland
Scots law